Arthur Vincent "Vin" Coutie (28 October 1881 – 17 June 1951) was an Australian rules footballer who played for Melbourne in the Victorian Football League (VFL) during the early 1900s.

A forward, Coutie topped the VFL's goalkicking in 1904 with 39 goals and became the first Melbourne player to achieve this distinction. Coutie was also the leading goalkicker at Melbourne in 1903 and 1908. He twice kicked eight goals in a game in his career, firstly in 1904 against Geelong and again in 1908 against St Kilda.

Coutie was a Victorian interstate representative in 1903 and 1904. He captained Melbourne in 1907 before being given the job again for the 1910 and 1911 seasons.

References

Holmesby, Russell and Main, Jim (2007). The Encyclopedia of AFL Footballers. 7th ed. Melbourne: Bas Publishing.

External links

1881 births
1951 deaths
Australian rules footballers from Melbourne
Australian Rules footballers: place kick exponents
Leopold Football Club (MJFA) players
Melbourne Football Club players
Melbourne Football Club captains
VFL Leading Goalkicker Medal winners
People from South Melbourne